Ilana Cicurel (born 8 February 1972) is a French lawyer and politician of La République En Marche! (LREM) who has been serving as a Member of the European Parliament since 2020.

Early life and education
Cicurel is the daughter of a French artist, and the sister of French economist .

She studied law at University of Paris 1 Pantheon-Sorbonne, and is a  Fulbright Scholar from Harvard Law School.

Early career
In 2008, Cicurel joined the Alliance israélite universelle where she was in charge of educational during the first three years, then served as General Manager until 2018.

Political career

Career in national politics
In 2017, Cicurel lost with a very short margin in the 2017 French legislative election.

Since November 2017, Cicurel has been part of LREM's executive board under the leadership of the party's successive chairmen Christophe Castaner and Stanislas Guerini.

Member of the European Parliament, 2019–present
In the 2019 European elections, Cicurel was placed in 23rd position on the list from La République En Marche!. After Brexit, she joined the European Parliament, when UK members seats were transferred to other countries. In parliament, she has since been serving on the Committee on Culture and Education. In addition to her committee assignments, she is part of the parliament’s delegation for relations with Israel.

References 

1972 births
Living people
Politicians from Paris
La République En Marche! MEPs
Pantheon-Sorbonne University alumni
Harvard Law School alumni
21st-century French women lawyers
21st-century French lawyers
MEPs for France 2019–2024
21st-century women MEPs for France
Fulbright alumni